Museo del Aire may refer to:
 Museo del Aire (Cuba), Havana
 Museo del Aire (Madrid)